The 1976 Canadian Club Masters was a professional non-ranking snooker tournament, which took place in the Northern Snooker Centre in Leeds, England.

Alex Higgins won the tournament, defeating Ray Reardon 6–4 in the final.

The television coverage was presented by Fred Dinenage. The commentator was Ted Lowe.

Main draw

References

Canadian Club Masters
Canadian Club Masters
Canadian Club Masters
Canadian Club Masters